Super What? is the second collaborative album by American hip hop supergroup Czarface and British-American rapper MF Doom. It was released on May 7, 2021. The album is a follow-up to their 2018 collaborative project Czarface Meets Metal Face, and is Doom's first posthumous release. The album contains features from Run-DMC's DMC, Del the Funky Homosapien, Kendra Morris, and That Handsome Devil's Godforbid.

Background and release
Apart from the album marking the trio's second collaborative LP with Doom, they also worked together on Czarface's 2015 track, "Ka-Bang!", off Every Hero Needs a Villain. Super What? was recorded in April 2020, and was originally slated for release that same month, but was delayed due to the COVID-19 pandemic. Czarface member Esoteric explained: 

The album consists of two halves, the "Doom Side" and the "Czar Side". It is accompanied by a comic book written by Esoteric and illustrated by Benjamin Marra.

The cover art by Lamour Supreme is based on the cover of issue 216 of the 1964 Marvel Comics series Daredevil.

Track listing

Charts

References

External links

2021 albums
MF Doom albums
Czarface albums
7L & Esoteric albums
Inspectah Deck albums
Collaborative albums
Albums published posthumously
Albums postponed due to the COVID-19 pandemic